The Women's alpine combined competition at the FIS Alpine World Ski Championships 2021 was scheduled for 8 February, but due to heavy snow that day it was postponed a full week to 15 February 2021.

Results
The super-G was started at 09:45, and the slalom at 14:10.

References

Women's alpine combined